The 2014 NCAA Division I Cross Country Championships were the 76th NCAA Men's Division I Cross Country Championship and the 34th NCAA Women's Division I Cross Country Championship held at the LaVern Gibson Cross Country Course in Terre Haute, Indiana near the campus of Indiana State University on November 22, 2014. Four different cross country running championships were contested: men's and women's individual and team championships.

On the men's side, the team national championship was won by the Colorado Buffaloes, their fifth, and second consecutive, title, while the individual championship was won by Edward Cheserek, his second consecutive title, from Oregon. On the women's side, the team championship was won by the Michigan State Spartans, their first title, and the individual championship was won by Kate Avery of Iona, her first title.

Men's title
Distance: 10,000 meters

Men's Team Result (Top 10)

Men's Individual Result (Top 10)

Women's title
Distance: 6,000 meters

Women's Team Result (Top 10)

Women's Individual Result (Top 10)

See also
 NCAA Men's Division I Cross Country Championship 
 NCAA Women's Division I Cross Country Championship

References
 

NCAA Cross Country Championships
NCAA Division I Cross Country Championships
NCAA Division I Cross Country Championships
NCAA Division I Cross Country Championships
Terre Haute, Indiana
Track and field in Indiana
Indiana State University